New Zealand men's junior national softball team is the junior national under-18 team for New Zealand. The team competed at the 1985 ISF Junior Men's World Championship in Fargo, North Dakota where they finished first. The team competed at the 1989 ISF Junior Men's World Championship in Summerside, Prince Edward Island where they finished first.  The team competed at the 1993 ISF Junior Men's World Championship in Auckland, New Zealand where they finished second.  The team competed at the 1997 ISF Junior Men's World Championship in St. John's, Newfoundland where they finished second.  The team competed at the 2001 ISF Junior Men's World Championship in Sydney, Australia where they finished fourth.  The team competed at the 2005 ISF Junior Men's World Championship in Summerside, Prince Edward Island where they finished fourth.  The team competed at the 2008 ISF Junior Men's World Championship in Whitehorse, Yukon where they finished fourth.  The team competed at the 2012 ISF Junior Men's World Championship in Parana, Argentina where they finished sixth.

Players

Current squad
The following 19 players were called up for the 2023 U-18 Men's Softball World Cup.

Cohen Bailey
Ciaran Bolger
Brandon Bristowe
Fletcher Due
Lennox Easthope
Arron Gollan
Katene Huriwai
Josh Kennedy
Hapene Kumeroa
George McCarroll
Jacob Neale
Jayden Potts
Shiloh Rice
Max Russell
Norpera Tangaroa
Zahr Shaw-Wallace
Hunter Simpson
Joe Simpson-Smith
Connor Stanley

References

External links 
 International Softball Federation

Softball
Softball in New Zealand
Men's junior national softball teams
Men's sport in New Zealand
Youth sport in New Zealand